The 2002 Winter Olympics torch relay was a 65-day run, from December 4, 2001 until February 8, 2002, prior to the 2002 Winter Olympics. The runners carried the Olympic Flame throughout the United States – following its lighting in Olympia, Greece to the opening ceremony of the 2002 games at Rice-Eccles Stadium in Salt Lake City, Utah. The 2002 torch relay was also the 50th anniversary of the Winter Olympic torch relay, which was first run during the 1952 Winter Olympics.

Planning
The Salt Lake Organizing Committee (SLOC) contracted with Além International Management, Inc. to plan the torch relay route, including security and marketing plans. The plan produced by SLOC and Além was announced to the public on December 4, 2000. It would have the torch cover  passing through 46 of the 50 states in the United States, and be carried by 12,012 torchbearers. The torch would pass through 300 communities, stopping twice a day: once for a midday celebration and then in a larger populated city for the night. 120 of the 300 communities would host the special celebrations, which would allow large groups of people to participate in the Olympic spirit. It also allowed each community to show off local talent, its people, and history. Atlanta, New York City, and Salt Lake City were all selected as special signature cities, and they would host large relay celebrations which would be paid for, planned, and controlled by SLOC. Later plans for special commemorations of September 11, 2001, along the relay route in Washington, D.C. and New York City, would be added to the route plan. The torch and all relay marketing would be designed to closely follow the 2002 Olympic theme Light the Fire Within and the look of the games theme Land of Contrast - Fire and Ice.

In February 2000 The Coca-Cola Company and Chevrolet signed an agreement with SLOC to become the official relay sponsors, agreeing to pay two-thirds of the $25 million relay cost. The remainder of the cost would be paid for by official relay providers, such as Delta Air Lines, who flew the flame from Greece to the United States and Union Pacific, whose trains transported the flame through parts of the United States.

In February 2001 the nomination process for torchbearers was begun, and the selected persons were announced in September 2001. SLOC had decided on a theme of Inspire for the Torchbearers, and people were encouraged to nominate those who inspire others. Of the 12,012 torchbearer positions, SLOC, Coca-Cola, and Chevrolet each got to select one-third of the nominees, while a few were reserved for providers and special guests at the Opening Ceremony. SLOC received approximately 50,000 nominations for its 3,500 positions, so applications were separated by ZIP code then sent to a local community judging panel who scored the applications and selected the torchbearers for their area. Coca-Cola and Chevrolet both received more than 120,000 applications for their positions, and both used a random selection process to choose torchbearers.

Relay elements

Torch
The 2002 Olympic Torch, engineered and manufactured by Coleman, is modeled after an icicle, with a slight curve to represent speed and fluidity. It was created with three sections, each with its own meaning and representation.

The top section was glass, and the Olympic flame burned within the glass, echoing the 2002 Olympic theme Light the Fire Within. The glass stood for purity, winter, ice, and nature. Also inside the glass was a geometric copper structure which helped hold the flame. Copper is a very important natural element of Utah, and represented fire, warmth, Utah's History, and mirrored the orange/red colors of the theme Fire and Ice. The center section was made of silver and finished to look old and worn, while the bottom section was made of clean, highly polished silver. The center section represented the silver mining heritage of the American West, while the bottom section represented the future and modern technology. The Torchbearer gripped the torch at the junction of both the aged and polished silver, during which their hand represented a bridge from the past to the present. The two silver sections also mirrored the blue/purple colors of the Fire and Ice theme.

Modes of transportation
The Olympic torch was carried through a variety of modes, including runners, skiers, motor vehicles, aircraft, boats, canoes and bicycle.

Aircraft
Delta Air Lines, one of the relay providers, was responsible for carrying the flame across the Atlantic Ocean from Athens, Greece to the United States. A Boeing 777, known as the Soaring Spirit, decorated in Olympic-themed livery carried the Olympic flame in a ceremonial lantern from Greece to Atlanta, Georgia during an 11-hour flight.

Railroad car

Union Pacific, another of the relay providers, used a specially designed railroad car to carry the flame across various areas of the United States (mainly rural and desert areas). Coined the "Cauldron Car", it was part of Union Pacific's "Olympic Train" which included two diesel locomotives (UP Numbers: 2001 & 2002), 13 passengers cars, and 3 service cars with the cauldron car serving as the caboose. The entire train was painted in Olympic livery, using Salt Lake's "Look of the Games" style, known as "Land of Contrast - Fire and Ice". The cauldron car contained a 2 million-BTU burner, to keep the flame burning, and was originally used during the torch relay for the 1996 Summer Olympics, and was simply redesigned and repainted for the 2002 games. The Olympic train carried the flame on four separate occasions during the 2002 torch relay, for a total of more than  through 11 states. Following the games the cauldron car was donated to the Utah State Railroad Museum at Union Station, where it is currently on display. In anticipation of the torch relay Overland Models (model railroading) created an H0 scale model of the Olympic Train, which included the two locomotives and several of the passenger cars. 

The Heber Valley Historic Railroad also played a role in the torch relay, its historic steam locomotives were joined by another from the Nevada Northern Railway Museum, and together they were known as the Olympic Steam Team. During the games all three locomotives would pull their own eight-car train loaded with spectators to the Soldier Hollow Olympic venue. The day prior to the Opening Ceremony of the games, all three locomotives were combined into one triple-headed train, and used to transport the Olympic flame from Soldier Hollow to Heber City, Utah as part of the torch relay.

Route

On November 19, 2001, the first 2002 Olympic torch was lit at the birthplace of the Olympic Games in Olympia, Greece. Greek actress Thalia Prokopiou played the role of high priestess and lit the torch using a flame kept in a clay urn. Usually the torch is lit using a parabolic mirror and the sun's rays, but for the third games in a row, cloudy conditions prevented that from happening during the ceremony. The weekend prior to the lighting ceremony, the flame held in the clay urn had been lit using the parabolic mirror and the sun's rays in case of this situation. Following the ceremony, a two-day Greek torch relay carried the flame to the Panathenian stadium in Athens, Greece, where it burned in a cauldron for two weeks.

On December 3, 2001, a Greek skier, Thanassis Tsailas, lit a 2002 Olympic torch from a flame in the cauldron, which in turn was used to light a ceremonial lantern. This lantern was then flown aboard the Soaring Spirit to Atlanta, Georgia, where it arrived on the morning of December 4. The lantern was unloaded and Bonnie Blair used its flame to light a temporary cauldron to be used at the celebration in Atlanta. During this celebration, Muhammad Ali lit a 2002 Olympic torch from the flame in the temporary cauldron, which he then passed to Olympians Peggy Fleming and Bob Paul, who began the 2002 Winter Olympics torch relay.

 December 3–4: Athens, Greece to Atlanta, Georgia to Greenville, South Carolina
 December 5: Greenville to Charlotte, North Carolina
 December 6: Charlotte to Charleston, South Carolina
 December 7: Charleston to Orlando, Florida
 December 8: Orlando to Miami, Florida
 December 9: Miami to New Orleans, Louisiana
 December 10: New Orleans to Beaumont, Texas
 December 11: Beaumont to Houston to San Antonio, to Austin, Texas
 December 12: San Antonio to Austin, Texas to Dallas, Texas
 December 13: Dallas to Little Rock, Arkansas
 December 14: Little Rock to Memphis, Tennessee
 December 15: Memphis to Nashville, Tennessee
 December 16: Nashville to Louisville, Kentucky
 December 17: Louisville to Cincinnati, Ohio
 December 18: Cincinnati to Charleston, West Virginia
 December 19: Charleston to Pittsburgh, Pennsylvania
 December 20: Pittsburgh to Martinsburg, West Virginia
 December 21: West Virginia to Washington, D.C.
 December 22: Washington to Philadelphia, Pennsylvania
 December 23: Philadelphia to New York City, New York
 December 24: New York City (rested in a special cauldron at Rockefeller Center for the Christmas Holiday)
 December 25: New York City (rested in a special cauldron at Rockefeller Center for the Christmas Holiday)
 December 26: New York City to Providence, Rhode Island
 December 27: Rhode Island to Boston, Massachusetts
 December 28: Boston to Lebanon, New Hampshire
 December 29: New Hampshire to Lake Placid, New York
 December 30: Lake Placid to Syracuse, New York
 December 31: Syracuse to Buffalo, New York
 January 1: Buffalo to Cleveland, Ohio
 January 2: Cleveland to Columbus, Ohio
 January 3: Columbus to Fort Wayne, Indiana
 January 4: Fort Wayne to Chicago, Illinois
 January 5: Chicago to Milwaukee, Wisconsin
 January 6: Milwaukee to Detroit, Michigan
 January 7: Detroit to Indianapolis, Indiana
 January 8: Indianapolis to St. Louis, Missouri
 January 9: St. Louis to Kansas City, Missouri
 January 10: Kansas City to Omaha, Nebraska
 January 11: Omaha to Oklahoma City, Oklahoma
 January 12: Oklahoma to Santa Fe, New Mexico
 January 13: New Mexico to Phoenix, Arizona
 January 14: Arizona to San Diego, California
 January 15: San Diego to Los Angeles, California
 January 16: Los Angeles to San Luis Obispo, California
 January 17: San Luis Obispo to Seaside, California
 January 18: Seaside to San Francisco, California
 January 19: San Francisco to Sacramento, California
 January 20: Sacramento to Lake Tahoe, California
 January 21: Lake Tahoe to Sparks, Nevada
 January 22: Sparks to Portland, Oregon
 January 23: Portland to Seattle, Washington
 January 24: Seattle to Alaska to Spokane, Washington
 January 25: Spokane to Boise, Idaho
 January 26: Boise to Idaho Falls, Idaho
 January 27: Idaho Falls to Bozeman, Montana
 January 28: Bozeman to Billings, Montana
 January 29: Billings to Cheyenne, Wyoming
 January 30: Cheyenne to Denver, Colorado
 January 31: Denver to Colorado Springs, Colorado (Columbine survivors Patrick Ireland, Richard Castaldo, and the father of victim John Tomlin got to pass the torch.)
 February 1: Colorado Springs to Vail, Colorado
 February 2: Vail to Grand Junction, Colorado
 February 3: Grand Junction to Southern Utah (no relay celebrations due to the Super Bowl)
 February 4: Southern Utah to St. George, Utah
 February 5: St. George to Provo, Utah
 February 6: Provo to Ogden, Utah
 February 7: Ogden to Downtown Salt Lake City, Utah
 February 8: Downtown Salt Lake City to Rice-Eccles Stadium for Opening Ceremony

See also
 Morse v. Frederick (2007)

Notes

External links

Official Site - Torch Relay (Archived)
UEN's 2002 Olympic Site - Torch Relay (Archived)
Utah's KSL-TV Torch Relay Coverage
http://sportsillustrated.cnn.com/olympics/2002/torchroute/ Torch Relay Map

Torch Relay, 2002 Winter Olympics
Olympic torch relays